Potamotrygon falkneri, the  largespot river stingray or reticulated freshwater stingray, is a species of freshwater stingray in the family Potamotrygonidae from tropical and subtropical South America. It is sometimes seen in the aquarium trade, but requires a very large tank.

Taxonomy and appearance

This species was originally described by ichthyologists Castex and Maciel in 1963.

This species is densely spotted above, but the exact color and pattern are very variable. One of these types was initially described as a separate species P. castexi and another as P. menchacai. Intermediates between the various patterns are common, and all represent variants of the species P. falkneri.

The so-called "tiger stingray" has sometimes been misidentified as P. menchacai (a synonym of P. falkneri), but it is a separate species that only was scientifically described as P. tigrina in 2011.

Etymology
The etymology of the term Potamotrygon derives from the Greek words potamos, which means 'river', and trygon which means 'sting ray'.

The species name is in honor of British Jesuit Tomas Falkner (1707-1784), (also spelled Thomas Falconer), for his apostolic and scientific work in Argentina in the 18th-century.

Distribution
This species has a disjunct distribution with the best-known population found throughout much of the Paraná—Paraguay River basin in southern Brazil, Paraguay, Uruguay and northeastern Argentina. Initially it did not occur in the upper Paraná basin above the Guaíra Falls, but these disappeared after the construction of the Itaipu Dam, allowing this species (and several others) to spread.

The other main distribution of P. falkneri is in the upper Amazon Basin: Madre de Díos, Guaporé, Beni, Marañón and Solimões Rivers in Bolivia, eastern Peru and western Brazil.

References

External links

falkneri
Freshwater fish of Argentina
Fish of Bolivia
Freshwater fish of Brazil
Fish of Paraguay
Freshwater fish of Peru
Fish of Uruguay
Fish of the Amazon basin
Fauna of the Pantanal
Taxa named by Mariano N. Castex
Taxa named by Ignacio Maciel
Fish described in 1963